Jean De Briac (born Jean-Frederic Weitler, 15 August 1891 – 18 October 1970) was a French film actor. He appeared in more than 120 films between 1920 and 1962. He was born in France and died in Los Angeles, California. He immigrated to the United States in 1915.

Selected filmography

The Frisky Mrs. Johnson (1920)
The Love Light (1921)
 High Heels (1921)
The Butterfly Girl (1921)
 The Lady from Longacre (1921)
The Power of Love (1922)
Another Man's Shoes (1922)
One Wonderful Night (1922)
Around the World in Eighteen Days (1923)
The Marriage Market (1923)
The Iron Man (1924)
Paris at Midnight (1926)
The Duchess of Buffalo (1926)
The Ladybird (1927)
Blotto (1930)
Be Big! (1931)
Wise Girl (1937)
Swiss Miss (1938)
Wee Wee Monsieur (1938)
Tassels in the Air (1938)
A Chump at Oxford (1940)
 Enemy Agent (1940)
Appointment in Berlin (1943)
Half Past Midnight (1948)

References

External links

 
 
 

1891 births
1970 deaths
20th-century French male actors
Burials at Valley Oaks Memorial Park
French emigrants to the United States
French male film actors
French male silent film actors